Dean Heath Garrett (born November 27, 1966) is a former American professional basketball player.

College career
Garrett attended San Clemente High School, in San Clemente, California, where he earned All-Conference, All-County, and All-Southern California honors, as a senior, in the 1983–84 season. After high school, Garrett played collegiately at the City College of San Francisco, from 1984 to 1986, where he led his team to the state finals, where they were defeated by Sacramento City College. The winning continued for Garrett, when he accepted a scholarship to Indiana University, where he was coached by Bob Knight, and helped the Hoosiers win the 1987 NCAA Division I Tournament.

Professional career
Garrett was selected in the second round, with the 38th overall pick of the 1988 NBA draft, by the Phoenix Suns, but he did not play in the NBA for eight seasons, as played in Italy and Greece instead. Prior to the NBA's 1996–97 season, Garrett was signed as a free agent. by the Minnesota Timberwolves, and afterwards played in the NBA for the next five seasons. He played for the Denver Nuggets (1997–98), the Timberwolves again, from (1998–99 to 2001–02), and the Golden State Warriors (2001–02,) after he was traded mid-season. During those six seasons, Garrett played in a total of 359 NBA regular season games, in which he averaged 19.4 minutes, 4.8 points, 5.0 rebounds, and 1.0 blocks per game, with a 0.480 field goal shooting percentage.

Post-playing career
After his retirement from playing pro club basketball, Garrett was living in Las Vegas, when some of his friends from Minneapolis contacted him about a business proposition in Minnesota. Garrett then moved to Minnesota, and he became a part owner in three businesses: a restaurant, a nightclub, and a wireless phone retailer. Garrett is married to Cristina Garrett and he has one child, Devyreau. He also has three sisters: Tracy, Kelly, and Elizabeth.

References

External links

1966 births
Living people
American expatriate basketball people in Germany
American expatriate basketball people in Greece
American expatriate basketball people in Italy
American men's basketball players
Basketball players at the 1987 Pan American Games
Basketball players from Los Angeles
Centers (basketball)
City College of San Francisco Rams men's basketball players
Denver Nuggets players
Golden State Warriors players
Greek Basket League players
Indiana Hoosiers men's basketball players
Lega Basket Serie A players
Medalists at the 1987 Pan American Games
Minnesota Timberwolves players
Pan American Games medalists in basketball
Pan American Games silver medalists for the United States
P.A.O.K. BC players
Phoenix Suns draft picks
Victoria Libertas Pallacanestro players
Viola Reggio Calabria players